Kitaagunnaat formerly the Cheere Islands are an island group located in Coronation Gulf, south of Victoria Island, west of Kiillinnguyaq (Kent Peninsula), in the Kitikmeot Region, Nunavut, Canada. Other island groups in the vicinity include the Barry Islands, Nakahungaqtuaryuit, Chapman Islands, Cockburn Islands, Nallukatarvik, and Stockport Islands.

References

External links 
 Kitikmeot Heritage Society Atlas Map Series 76N

Islands of Coronation Gulf
Uninhabited islands of Kitikmeot Region